The House Subcommittee on Healthy Families and Communities is a former subcommittee within the United States House Committee on Education and Labor. It was also known as the Subcommittee on Select Education. The subcommittee was eliminated in 2011, and its jurisdiction transferred to other subcommittees.

Jurisdiction
From the Official Subcommittee website, the Subcommittee's jurisdiction includes:

Adolescent development and training programs, including but not limited to those providing for the care and treatment of certain at risk youth, including the Juvenile Justice and Delinquency Prevention Act and the Runaway and Homeless Youth Act; all matters dealing with child abuse and domestic violence, including the Child Abuse Prevention and Treatment Act, and child adoption; school lunch and child nutrition, poverty programs including the Community Services Block Grant Act, and the Low Income Home Energy Assistance Program (LIHEAP); all matters dealing with programs and services for the elderly, including nutrition programs and the Older Americans Act; environmental education; all domestic volunteer programs; library services and construction, and programs related to the arts and humanities, museum services, and arts and artifacts indemnity.

Current members, 111th Congress

References

External links
House Education and Labor Committee Members

Education Healthy Families and Communities